Joan Hill (December 19, 1930 – June 16, 2020), also known as Che-se-quah, was a Muscogee Creek artist of Cherokee ancestry. She was one of the most awarded Native American women artists in the 20th century.

Personal
Joan Hill was born in Muskogee, Oklahoma on December 19, 1930, the daughter of William M. and Winnie Harris Hill.

She descended from both Muscogee Creek and Cherokee chiefs. She chose the name Cheh-se-quah, Muscogee for "Redbird," for both her great-grandfather, Redbird Harris, and her maternal grandfather.

Hill lived on the site of the old Confederate Fort Davis, located on the south bank of the Arkansas River two and one-half miles northeast of present Muskogee, with her family. Her studio was adjacent to a Pre-Columbian Indian mound dating from 1200 CE.

Art career

Hill attended Bacone College. In 1952, she received her BA degree in Education from Northeastern State University of Tahlequah, Oklahoma in 1952. In 1953, Hill took the Famous Artists Course. She was a public art teacher for four years before becoming a full-time artist.

She received more than 290 awards from countries including Great Britain and Italy. Other honors include over 20 Grand Awards, and the Waite Phillips Artist Trophy. In addition, Hill was the winner of a prestigious mural competition at the Daybreak Star Performing Arts Center from the Seattle Arts Commission in Washington. In 1974 Hill was given the title "Master Artist" by the Five Civilized Tribes Museum in Muskogee.

Over 110 of her works are in permanent collections, including the Sequoyah National Research Center in Little Rock, Arkansas, the United States Department of the Interior Museums of the Indian Arts and Crafts Board, Washington, D.C. and the Smithsonian Museum of the American Indian, New York City. State appointments include to the Governor's Commission on the Status of Women by Governor Henry Bellmon, 1989. National Appointments include U.S. Commissioner to the Indian Arts and Crafts Board, Washington D.C., by the U.S. Secretary of the Interior-2000. In 2000, Hill was the "Honored One" of the Red Earth festival in Oklahoma City, Oklahoma.

Artwork
Hill is known most for her stylized, acrylic paintings of historical and cultural scenes, employed a limited palette of neutrals, oranges, reds, and purples. Painting with watercolors, she let negative space define foliage, mounds, or other landscape features. "Each element of her paintings is purposeful," writes author Susan C. Power. She predominantly painted Muscogee and Cherokee women and frequently painted nude figures. Hill also explored nonobjective abstraction.

Hill said in 1991, "Art widens the scope of the inner and outer senses and enriches life by giving us a greater awareness of the world."

In 2018 through 2020, her painting was exhibited in the exhibition Hearts of Our People: Native Women Artists at the Smithsonian American Art Museum.

Death 
Hill died on June 16, 2020.

See also
List of Native American artists
Visual arts by indigenous peoples of the Americas

References

External links
 Joan Hill profile
Oral History interview with Joan Hill from the Oklahoma Native Artist program

1930 births
2020 deaths
People from Muskogee, Oklahoma
Muscogee (Creek) Nation people
Muscogee (Creek) Nation people of Cherokee descent
Painters from Oklahoma
20th-century indigenous painters of the Americas
Bacone College alumni
Northeastern State University alumni
20th-century American painters
20th-century American women artists
21st-century American painters
21st-century American women artists
Native American women artists
20th-century Native American women
21st-century Native American women